Enrique Molina Garmendia (August 4, 1871, La Serena, Chile - March 8, 1964, Concepción, Chile) was a Chilean educator and philosopher who promoted and aided in the development of the decentralization of education in Chile. His greatest achievement was founding the Universidad de Concepción (University of Concepción), the third oldest university in Chile and the first to be located outside the capital Santiago. Garmendia is considered the most distinguished pedagogue of his time, as well as one of the most influential Chilean philosophers.

He received various distinctions during his lifetime, among them the honor of Doctor Honoris Causa from the University of Chile and that of Rector Honorario Vitalicio (Honorary University President for Life) from the University of Concepción.

Publications 
Some of his main works, including books, scientific, and philosophical articles:
 1907 - The Task of the Professor and Education
 1909 - The Social Philosophy of Lester Ward
 1909 - Science and Traditionalism
 1909 - The Pragmatism of William James
 1912 - Culture and General Education
 1913 - American Philosophy (Collection of Essays)
 1914 - Contemporary Education
 1917 - American Democracies and What They Have to Do
 1920 - On the Two Americas
 1921 - From California to Harvard (Studies about the North American University and Some Problems of Ours)
 1935 - The Russian and Bolchevista Revoluction
 1940 - Projects of the Intuition
 1941 - Pilgrimage of the University
 1942 - A Philospical Confesion and a Call for Improving Hispanic America
 1943 - Memories of Don Valentín Letelier
 1944 - The Philosophy of Bergson
 1944 - Nietzche, Dionysianism, and Asceticism. His Life and Ideology
 1947 - On Spirituality in Human Life
 1952 - Tragedy and Realization of the Spirit

Distinctions 
The work Tribute to the Spirit of the Founders of the University of Concepción, designed by Samuel Román, honors Enrique Molina as the co-founder and first rector of the University of Concepción.

In his various trips through other countries Molina Garmendia received multiple distinction and awards including:

 Goethe Medal, Germany
 Academic member of the Faculty of Philosophy at the University of Chile, Santiago
 Official of the Academy of Ministry of Public Instrucion, France
 Knight of the Crown, Italy
 Member of the athenaeum, Mexico
 Award of Art from the Municipality of Concepión, 1953, Concepción, Chile

Additionally in 1956 he was named the rector of the University of Conceptión for life; in 1959 the author Samuel Román erected in his name the monument Tribute to the Spirit of the Founders of the University of Concepción, placed at the City University of Conceptión. The same year he received the honorary title, Doctor Honoris Causa at the University of Chile.

References

External links 
 Web oficial del Liceo Enrique Molina Garmendia (archived) 
 Source of images about Enrique Molina Garmendia

1871 births
1964 deaths
Chilean philosophers
Chilean people of Basque descent
Liceo Gregorio Cordovez alumni
University of Chile alumni
Academic staff of the University of Concepción